Mitchell Dunn (born 3 February 1997) is an Australian professional rugby league footballer who plays as a  or er for the North Queensland Cowboys in the NRL.

Background
Dunn was born on the Gold Coast, Queensland, Australia and grew up in Mackay, Queensland. 

He played his junior rugby league for Mackay Brothers and attended St Patrick's College, before being signed by the North Queensland Cowboys.

Playing career

Early years
In 2013, Dunn played for the Mackay Cutters' Cyril Connell Cup side and represented Queensland under-16s. In 2014, he moved up to the Cutters' Mal Meninga Cup side before moving to Townsville to join the North Queensland Cowboys under-20s squad in 2015. That season, he played in the Townsville Stingers' Mal Meninga Cup winning side and was selected for Queensland under-18s, before making his debut for the Cowboys' under-20s team.

In 2017, Dunn captained the North Queensland Cowboys NYC team and represented the Queensland under-20s side. In October 2017, he re-signed with North Queensland on a two-year contract until the end of 2019, joining their NRL squad.

2018
In 2018, Dunn graduated to the North Queensland Cowboys Queensland Cup feeder side, the Mackay Cutters. In Round 13 of the 2018 NRL season, he made his NRL debut, coming off the bench against the Manly-Warringah Sea Eagles.

2019
Dunn played the first four games of the season for the North Queensland side, before being dropped back to the Mackay Cutters. He returned to first grade in Round 9, playing five games, earning his first start at second row in a 22–16 win over the Canberra Raiders. In Round 13, Dunn dislocated his shoulder in North Queensland's 20–22 loss to the Manly-Warringah Sea Eagles, ruling him out for the season.

On 4 September, he signed a one-year contract extension with North Queensland.

2020
In February, Dunn was a member of the North Queensland 2020 NRL Nines winning squad. After starting the season coming off the bench, Dunn established himself as a starting er for the Cowboys. On 31 July, he re-signed with the North Queensland outfit until the end of the 2022 season.

In Round 14, he scored his first try in a 30–31 loss to the South Sydney Rabbitohs. On 3 October, Dunn won the Cowboys' Coach's Award.

Achievements and accolades

Individual
North Queensland Cowboys Coach's Award: 2020

Team
2020 NRL Nines: North Queensland Cowboys – Winners

Statistics

NRL
 Statistics are correct to the end of the 2020 season

References

External links

North Queensland Cowboys profile
NRL profile

1997 births
Living people
Australian rugby league players
North Queensland Cowboys players
Rugby league second-rows
Rugby league players from Gold Coast, Queensland